Dinesh is a common Hindu male given name. The Sanskrit word  is a compound of  'day' and  'lord', meaning 'day-lord', an epithet of the Sun. Notable people with the name include:
 Dinesh, Indian film actor
 Dinesh Baboo, Indian film director, cinematographer, producer, actor and screenwriter
 Dinesh Chand, Fijian golfer
Dinesh Chandimal, Sri Lankan cricketer
 Dinesh Chandra Sen, Indian researcher on Bengali folklore
 Dinesh D'Souza, Indian-American political commentator
 Dinesh Gunawardena, Sri Lankan politician
 Dinesh Gupta, Indian freedom fighter and revolutionary
 Dinesh Hingoo, Indian actor
 Dinesh Karthik, Indian cricketer
 Dinesh Kumar, Indian choreographer
 Dinesh Lamba, Indian actor
 Dinesh Mongia, Indian cricketer
 Dinesh Nandan Sahay, Indian governor
 Dinesh Nayak, Indian Hockey player
 Dinesh Patel, Indian professional baseball player
 Dinesh Prasad Singh, Indian politician
 Dinesh Sharma, Indian politician 
 Dinesh Singh, Indian politician
 Dinesh Singh, Punjab politician
Dinesh Subasinghe, Sri Lankan composer, violinist and music producer

References 

Indian masculine given names